The Arcade Building is a historic enclosed arcade in Columbia, South Carolina that was added to the National Register of Historic Places on November 17, 1982.

Architecture and history 
The Arcade Building was constructed in 1912 by the Equitable Real Estate Company, and is reported to have cost 200,000 dollars ($ today). There are two identical terra cotta façades that face Main and Washington streets in an "L" shape. The Arcade Building has two stories, plus a basement. Both floors have five bays.

References 

Commercial buildings on the National Register of Historic Places in South Carolina
Commercial buildings completed in 1912
Buildings and structures in Columbia, South Carolina
National Register of Historic Places in Columbia, South Carolina
1912 establishments in South Carolina